Myroslav Ivanovych Dochynets (born 3 September 1959) is a Ukrainian writer and journalist. In 2003, he became a member of the Association of Ukrainian Writers.

Life and career
Dochynets was born in Khust, Zakarpattia Oblast, Ukraine in a family of teachers. In 1977, he enrolled at Lviv University's Faculty of Journalism. In 1982, he began working as a journalist at the newspaper "Youth of Transcarpatia". He founded the newspaper "News of Mukachevo" in 1990 and the publishing house "Carpathian Tower" in 1998.

Dochynets works in the field of literature since the 1980s. He is the author of about twenty books, including novels, short stories and the philosophical and psychological testament "Many years. Happy years" that has become a bestseller in several Slavic countries. His works have been translated into Russian, Hungarian, Slovak, Romanian, Polish, French, English, Japanese, Italian.

Dochynets is a member of the Writer's Union of Ukraine and the Association of Ukrainian Writers. He is the winner of two international literary awards and the "Golden Ukrainian Writers" award for the largest circulation of a book. He was nominated for three consecutive years for the Taras Shevchenko National Literary Prize.

Awards 
 1998 — "Journalist of the year in Zakarpattia"
 2004 — winner of the "Carpathian Crown" international literary award 
 2012 — Golden Writer of Ukraine award

References

Ukrainian writers
Ukrainian journalists
Living people
1959 births
People from Khust